Senna alata is an important medicinal tree, as well as an ornamental flowering plant in the subfamily Caesalpinioideae. It also known as emperor's candlesticks, candle bush, candelabra bush, Christmas candles, empress candle plant, ringworm shrub, or candletree. A remarkable species of Senna, it was sometimes separated in its own genus, Herpetica.

Geographic range
Senna alata is native to most of the Neotropics (from Mexico and the West Indies to Paraguay), and can be found in diverse habitats. It is an invasive species in Austronesia distributed in ranges from India to America. These plants have a greater ornamental and medicinal value in the southeast Asia, North Australia and African ranges.

Description

The leaves close in the dark.

The inflorescence looks like a yellow candle.

The fruit, shaped like a straight pod, is up to 25 cm long.  Its seeds are distributed by water or animals.

On both sides of the pods is a wing that runs the length of the pod. Pods contain 50 to 60 flattened, triangular seeds.

Cultivation
This species is easy to grow from the seed. They may either be sown directly or started in a nursery.

Medicinal uses
Senna alata (also known as Cassia alata) is often called the ringworm bush because of its very effective fungicidal properties, for treating ringworm and other fungal infections of the skin. The leaves are ground in a mortar to obtain a kind of "green cotton wool". This is mixed with the same amount of vegetable oil and rubbed on the affected area two or three times a day. A fresh preparation is made every day. Its active ingredients include the yellow chrysophanic acid.

Its laxative effect, due to its anthraquinone content, is also well proven.

Senna alata is locally known as akapulko in the Philippines where it is used as both an ornamental and medicinal plant due to its laxative, purgative and anti-fungal properties.

In Sri Lanka, known as Ath-thora, it is used as an ingredient in Sinhala traditional medicine.

In Malaysia, it is known as Gelenggang.

Images

References

Sources

Pacific Island Ecosystems at Risk (PIER)
International Legume Database & Information Service

External links

alata
Plants described in 1753
Taxa named by Carl Linnaeus